Multiplicity is a 2005 studio album by American drummer Dave Weckl.

Track listing
 "Watch Your Step"
 "Elements of Surprise"
 "Vuelo"
 "Inner Vision"
 "What It Is"
 "Chain Reaction"
 "Cascade"
 "Mixed Bag"
 "Down On The Corner"

Personnel
Dave Weckl - Drums, Percussion
Steve Weingart - Keyboards
Gary Meek - Tenor and Soprano Saxophones, Alto Flute, Bass Clarinet
Tom Kennedy - Bass on "Watch Your Step", "Vuelo", "Inner Vision", "Chain Reaction", "Mixed Bag"
Ric Fierabracci - Bass on "Elements of Surprise", "What It Is", "Cascade", "Down on the Corner"
Paul Pesco - Guitar on "Watch Your Step", "What It Is", "Chain Reaction", "Cascade", "Mixed Bag", "Down on the Corner"
Richie Gajate Garcia - Percussion on "Elements of Surprise", "Vuelo", "Inner Vision", "Cascade", "Mixed Bag"

External links
 A review (All About Jazz)

Dave Weckl albums
2005 albums